A skywalk is a type of pedestrian bridge

Skywalk may also refer to:
 SkyWalk, a covered walkway in Toronto, Canada
Skywalk (album), a 1984 album by jazz organist Jimmy McGriff
 Skywalk (band), a Canadian jazz fusion band
 Skywalk GmbH & Co. KG, a German aircraft manufacturer
 Skywalk (Jackerath), a viewing point at the Garzweiler open-pit lignite mine, Germany
 Skywalk Observatory, an observation deck in Boston, United States
 Grand Canyon Skywalk, a glass-bottomed bridge in Arizona, United States
 Minneapolis Skyway System, an interlinked collection of enclosed pedestrian footbridges
 Sydney Tower Skywalk, an observation deck in Sydney, Australia
 Skywalking, a form of tightrope walking